This article contains tables of U.S. cities and metropolitan areas with information about the population aged 5 and over that speaks Spanish at home. The tables do not reflect the total number or percentage of people who know Spanish.

Metropolitan areas
Number of people aged five or older who speak Spanish at home and proportion of population for metropolitan areas with a total population 500,000 or more.

Cities proper
The following information relates to areas within the cities' municipal borders, not their metropolitan areas, and notes the percentage and number of people age five or older who speak Spanish at home in several of the largest U.S. cities.

See also 
 List of U.S. cities with large Hispanic and Latino populations
 List of U.S. states by Hispanic and Latino population

References

Sources
Source: "Language spoken at home - 25 largest cities: 2008", U.S. Census Bureau, American Community Survey

Spanish Speaking
Spanish language in the United States
Cities by Spanish-speaking population
Spanish-language lists